Pokinatcha is the debut studio album by punk rock band MxPx released on October 4, 1994, through Tooth & Nail Records. The album reflects influence from skate/surf punk, and underground punk generally. The album's name came from a Snicker's candy bar commercial, which included an ad jingle saying hunger is, "Poking at you". The songs are characterized by their raw punk sound, catchy rhythm, and classic punk three-chord guitar style. It was the only album to include original guitarist Andy Husted.

Reception

Track listing

Personnel
 Mike Herrera - bass, vocals
 Andy Husted - guitar, background vocals
 Yuri Ruley - drums

References 

1994 debut albums
MxPx albums
Albums produced by Aaron Sprinkle
Tooth & Nail Records albums